Tucker School may refer to:

Tucker School (Tucker, Arkansas), listed on the National Register of Historic Places in Jefferson County, Arkansas
Tucker School (Spiro, Oklahoma), listed on the National Register of Historic Places in Le Flore County, Oklahoma